

The 2007 Sunderland Council election took place on 3 May 2007 to elect members of Sunderland Metropolitan Borough Council in Tyne and Wear, England. One third of the council was up for election and the Labour Party stayed in overall control of the council.

Background
Before the election the council had 57 Labour, 13 Conservative, 4 independent and 1 Liberal Democrat councillors. In the period since the previous local elections in May 2006, three councillors had left their parties to sit as Independents: Peter Maddison leaving the Liberal Democrat Group in July 2006, and Bryn Sidaway (Hendon) and George Blyth (Doxford) leaving the Labour Group in November 2006. Blyth's ward colleague Mike Tansey had previously left the Labour Group to sit as an Independent in November 2005, and stood for re-election as an Independent candidate in this election.

25 seats were contested in the 2007 elections with a total of 111 candidates standing. These included a full 25 each from the Labour, Conservative and British National Party, as well as 16 independents, 15 Liberal Democrats, 2 Respect, 2 British First Party and 1 from the United Kingdom Independence Party.

As at the 2006 election this election saw Sunderland have three polling stations open for 10 days before election day in an attempt to make voting more convenient for voters.

Election results
The results had Labour stay in control of the council but with a smaller majority. The Conservatives gained 3 seats from Labour in St Chads, Washington East and Washington South to hold 16 seats compared to 54 for Labour. The 2 Conservative gains in Washington were the first time the party had won seats in the town since it became part of Sunderland council. Labour also lost one seat to an independent in Copt Hill, but regained another in Doxford where the sitting independent councillor, Mike Tansey, had originally been elected for the Labour Party. This meant there remained 4 Independents on the council, as well as 1 Liberal Democrat who was not defending a seat in the election. Overall turnout in the election was 34%, up on 32% at the 2006 election.

This resulted in the following composition of the Council:

Ward by ward results

Barnes ward

Castle ward

Copt Hill ward

Doxford ward 

†Mike Tansey had been elected in 2004 as a Labour candidate, but subsequently left the party to sit as an Independent councillor. The result was technically a hold for Labour although Tansey, the incumbent, lost his seat.

Fulwell ward

Hendon ward

Hetton ward

Houghton ward

Millfield ward

Pallion ward

Redhill ward

Ryhope ward

Sandhill ward

Shiney Row ward

Silksworth ward

Southwick ward

St Anne's ward

St Chad's ward

St Michael's ward

St Peter's ward

Washington Central ward

Washington East ward

Washington North ward

Washington South ward

Washington West ward

References

2007 English local elections
2007
21st century in Tyne and Wear